The 2019 Women's World Draughts Championship at the international draughts was held from 11–23 June 2019 in Yakutsk, Russia under the auspices International Draughts Federation FMJD. Sixteen female players competed in the tournament, which was played as a round-robin.

Participants

Reserve

 Aygul Idrisova (Russia)
 Tamara Tansykkuzhina (Russia)
 Yulia Makarenkova (Ukraine)
 Olga Baltazhy (Ukraine)
 Nika Leopoldova (Russia)
 Elena Cesnokova (Latvia)

Rules
The final classification will be based on the total points obtained.

If two or more players share the same place, the following factors will be used to define the places occupied:

1. the largest number of victories

2. the best result between the tied players

3. the best result obtained in order of the classification

If this criteria will not decide final order, then to share the places 1, 2 or 3 will be played tie-break with Lehmann-Georgiev system, other places will be shared.

Schedule

Crosstable

Results by round

 Round 1
 Natalia Shestakova – Ksenia Nakhova 0–2
 Tamara Tansykkuzhina – Heike Verheul 2–0
 Aygul Idrisova – Viktoriya Motrichko 1–1
 Matrena Nogovitsyna – You Zhang 1–1
 Hanqing Zhao – Enkhbold Khuslen 2–0
 Annelaine Jacobs – Elsa Negbre 0–2
 Natalia Sadowska – Palina Petrusiova 1–1
 Olga Fedorovich – Darja Fedorovich 1–1

 Round 2
 Ksenia Nakhova – Darja Fedorovich 1–1
 Palina Petrusiova – Olga Fedorovich 1–1
 Elsa Negbre – Natalia Sadowska 0–2
 Enkhbold Khuslen – Annelaine Jacobs 2–0
 You Zhang – Hanqing Zhao 1–1
 Viktoriya Motrichko – Matrena Nogovitsyna 0–2
 Heike Verheul – Aygul Idrisova1–1
 Natalia Shestakova – Tamara Tansykkuzhina0–2

 Round 3
 Tamara Tansykkuzhina– Ksenia Nakhova 1–1
 Natalia Shestakova – Aygul Idrisova1–1
 Matrena Nogovitsyna – Heike Verheul 1–1
 Hanqing Zhao – Viktoriya Motrichko 2–0
 Annelaine Jacobs – You Zhang 0–2
 Natalia Sadowska – Enkhbold Khuslen 2–0
 Olga Fedorovich – Elsa Negbre 2–0
 Darja Fedorovich – Palina Petrusiova 2–0

 Round 4
 Ksenia Nakhova – Palina Petrusiova 1–1
 Elsa Negbre – Darja Fedorovich 0–2
 Enkhbold Khuslen – Olga Fedorovich 0–2
 You Zhang – Natalia Sadowska 1–1
 Viktoriya Motrichko – Annelaine Jacobs 2–0
 Heike Verheul – Hanqing Zhao 1–1
 Natalia Shestakova – Matrena Nogovitsyna 2–0
 Tamara Tansykkuzhina– Aygul Idrisova 1–1

 Round 5
 Aygul Idrisova – Ksenia Nakhova 1–1
 Matrena Nogovitsyna – Tamara Tansykkuzhina 1–1
 Hanqing Zhao – Natalia Shestakova 1–1
 Annelaine Jacobs –  Heike Verheul 0–2
 Natalia Sadowska – Viktoriya Motrichko 1–1
 Olga Fedorovich – You Zhang 0–2
 Darja Fedorovich – Enkhbold Khuslen 2–0
 Palina Petrusiova – Elsa Negbre 2–0

 Round 6
 Ksenia Nakhova – Elsa Negbre 2–0
 Enkhbold Khuslen – Palina Petrusiova 1–1
 You Zhang – Darja Fedorovich 1–1
 Viktoriya Motrichko – Olga Fedorovich 0–2
 Heike Verheul – Natalia Sadowska 1–1
 Natalia Shestakova – Annelaine Jacobs 2–0
 Tamara Tansykkuzhina – Hanqing Zhao 1–1
 Aygul Idrisova – Matrena Nogovitsyna 2–0

 Round 7
 Matrena Nogovitsyna – Ksenia Nakhova 2–0
 Hanqing Zhao – Aygul Idrisova 1–1
 Annelaine Jacobs – Tamara Tansykkuzhina 0–2
 Natalia Sadowska – Natalia Shestakova 1–1
 Olga Fedorovich – Heike Verheul 2–0
 Darja Fedorovich – Viktoriya Motrichko 1–1
 Palina Petrusiova – You Zhang 1–1
 Elsa Negbre – Enkhbold Khuslen 1–1

 Round 8
 Ksenia Nakhova – Enkhbold Khuslen 1–1
 You Zhang – Elsa Negbre 2–0
 Viktoriya Motrichko – Palina Petrusiova 1–1
 Heike Verheul – Darja Fedorovich 0–2
 Natalia Shestakova – Olga Fedorovich 1–1
 Tamara Tansykkuzhina – Natalia Sadowska 0–2
 Aygul Idrisova – Annelaine Jacobs 2–0
 Matrena Nogovitsyna – Hanqing Zhao 1–1

 Round 9
 Hanqing Zhao – Ksenia Nakhova 1–1
 Annelaine Jacobs – Matrena Nogovitsyna 0–2
 Natalia Sadowska – Aygul Idrisova 1–1
 Olga Fedorovich – Tamara Tansykkuzhina 1–1
 Darja Fedorovich – Natalia Shestakova 1–1
 Palina Petrusiova – Heike Verheul 1–1
 Elsa Negbre – Viktoriya Motrichko 0–2
 Enkhbold Khuslen – You Zhang 1–1

 Round 10
 Ksenia Nakhova – You Zhang 1–1
 Viktoriya Motrichko – Enkhbold Khuslen 1–1
 Heike Verheul – Elsa Negbre 1–1
 Natalia Shestakova – Palina Petrusiova 0–2
 Tamara Tansykkuzhina  – Darja Fedorovich 1–1
 Aygul Idrisova – Olga Fedorovich 1–1
 Matrena Nogovitsyna – Natalia Sadowska 1–1
 Hanqing Zhao – Annelaine Jacobs 2–0

 Round 11
 Annelaine Jacobs – Ksenia Nakhova 0–2
 Natalia Sadowska – Hanqing Zhao 1–1
 Olga Fedorovich – Matrena Nogovitsyna 0–2
 Darja Fedorovich – Aygul Idrisova 1–1
 Palina Petrusiova – Tamara Tansykkuzhina  1–1
 Elsa Negbre – Natalia Shestakova 0–2
 Enkhbold Khuslen – Heike Verheul 1–1
 You Zhang – Viktoriya Motrichko 1–1

 Round 12
 Ksenia Nakhova – Viktoriya Motrichko 1–1
 Heike Verheul – You Zhang 1–1
 Natalia Shestakova – Enkhbold Khuslen 0–2
 Tamara Tansykkuzhina  – Elsa Negbre 2–0
 Aygul Idrisova – Palina Petrusiova 2–0
 Matrena Nogovitsyna – Darja Fedorovich 1–1
 Hanqing Zhao – Olga Fedorovich 1–1
 Annelaine Jacobs – Natalia Sadowska 0–2

 Round 13
 Natalia Sadowska – Ksenia Nakhova 1–1
 Olga Fedorovich – Annelaine Jacobs 2–0
 Darja Fedorovich – Hanqing Zhao 1–1
 Palina Petrusiova – Matrena Nogovitsyna 1–1
 Elsa Negbre – Aygul Idrisova 0–2
 Enkhbold Khuslen – Tamara Tansykkuzhina 0–2
 You Zhang – Natalia Shestakova 1–1
 Viktoriya Motrichko – Heike Verheul 1–1

 Round 14
 Ksenia Nakhova – Heike Verheul 2–0
 Natalia Shestakova – Viktoriya Motrichko 0–2
 Tamara Tansykkuzhina  – You Zhang 1–1
 Aygul Idrisova – Enkhbold Khuslen 2–0
 Matrena Nogovitsyna – Elsa Negbre +/–
 Hanqing Zhao – Palina Petrusiova 0–2
 Annelaine Jacobs – Darja Fedorovich 0–2
 Natalia Sadowska – Olga Fedorovich 1–1

 Round 15
 Olga Fedorovich – Ksenia Nakhova 1–1
 Darja Fedorovich – Natalia Sadowska 1–1
 Palina Petrusiova – Annelaine Jacobs 2–0
 Elsa Negbre – Hanqing Zhao –/+
 Enkhbold Khuslen – Matrena Nogovitsyna 0–2
 You Zhang – Aygul Idrisova 1–1
 Viktoriya Motrichko – Tamara Tansykkuzhina 0–2 
 Heike Verheul – Natalia Shestakova 1–1

References

External links
Official site
Results on site FMJD
Results on site KNDB

Draughts world championships
2019 in draughts
2019 in Russian women's sport
Sport in Yakutsk
International sports competitions hosted by Russia
June 2019 sports events in Russia